The 2022 Tobago Council of the People's National Movement election will be held on April 24, 2022. For the second time, a one member, one vote voting system will be adopted for all 17 positions contested since being implemented in the last election. The winner will automatically become a deputy leader of the PNM at the national level. This election precedes the internal election of the leadership of the party at the national level in the 2022 People's National Movement leadership election.

Background 
The announcement of an early election for political leader, chairman, vice-chairman and secretary with the election for the other 13 executive positions whose terms ended in January was made on February 10, 2022. 

This leadership election follows a rapid decline for the PNM since 2013, with the party losing votes and seats in the 2013 Tobago House of Assembly election under the leadership of Kelvin Charles and the PNM's deadlock result in the January 2021 Tobago House of Assembly election and historic landslide defeat in the December 2021 Tobago House of Assembly election

Under the leadership of Tracy Davidson-Celestine who was elected as the party's first female political leader in the 2020 Tobago Council of the People's National Movement leadership election, and would have made history as the first female Chief Secretary of Tobago and the subsequent resignation of five of the party's executives.

Positions contested 
All 17 positions on the Executive of the Tobago Council will be contested:

Candidates 
Roles in bold are currently held.

Declared 

Potential

See also 

 2022 People's National Movement leadership election
 December 2021 Tobago House of Assembly election
 January 2021 Tobago House of Assembly election

Notes

References

External links 

 Official website
 Tobago House of Assembly

People's National Movement leadership election
Trinidad and Tobago
People's National Movement leadership election
Indirect elections
Politics of Trinidad and Tobago
Elections in Trinidad and Tobago
Trinidad and Tobago